James Anderson Merchant (born August 30, 1950) is an American former professional baseball catcher.

Merchant attended Murphy High School in his native city, Mobile, Alabama. He then attended and graduated from Auburn University. After signing with the Red Sox, he began his pro career in 1972 and spent eight seasons in Boston's farm system, including five with the Triple-A Pawtucket Red Sox. 

Of his three MLB games played, the most notable was his debut. On September 28, 1975 — the day after the Red Sox secured the 1975 American League East Division championship — Merchant was Boston's starting catcher against the Cleveland Indians at Fenway Park. Batting third in the lineup, Merchant collected two singles and a base on balls in five plate appearances. He played errorless ball in the field, recording two putouts, one assist and one caught stealing, although he allowed one stolen base (to the Indians' Oscar Gamble). Because he was a late-season call-up from the minor leagues, he was not on the Red Sox' postseason roster.

Merchant's minor-league career ended in 1979. He currently resides in Malcolm, Alabama.

References

External links

1950 births
Living people
Baseball players from Alabama
Boston Red Sox players
Bristol Red Sox players
Major League Baseball catchers
Pawtucket Red Sox players
Sportspeople from Mobile, Alabama
Winston-Salem Red Sox players